is a district located in Miyazaki Prefecture, Japan.

Following the March 23, 2010 Nojiri merger the district consists since then of the single town of Takaharu. As of October 1, 2019 the district has an estimated population of 8,709 and a density of 102 persons per km2. The total area is 85.39 km2.

Towns and villages 

Takaharu

Mergers
On March 20, 2006 the village of Suki merged into the city of Kobayashi.
On March 23, 2010 the town of Nojiri merged into the city of Kobayashi.

References

Districts in Miyazaki Prefecture